Marshall "Lefty" Scott (July 15, 1915 – March 3, 1964) was a Major League Baseball pitcher who played for the Philadelphia Phillies in 1945. The 29-year-old rookie was a native of Roswell, New Mexico.

Scott is one of many ballplayers who only appeared in the major leagues during World War II. He made his major league debut on June 15, 1945 in a road game against the New York Giants at the Polo Grounds. His season and career totals include 8 games pitched, 2 starts, 0 complete games, a 0–2 record with 3 games finished, 11 earned runs allowed in 22 innings, and an ERA of 4.43.

Scott died from a fractured skull sustained in an industrial accident on March 3, 1964, at the age of 48 in Houston, Texas.

References

External links

1915 births
1964 deaths
Abbeville A's players
Accidental deaths in Texas
Atlanta Crackers players
Baseball players from New Mexico
Greenville Majors players
Hobbs Boosters players
Houma Buccaneers players
Industrial accident deaths
Knoxville Smokies players
Lufkin Foresters players
Major League Baseball pitchers
Natchez Pilgrims players
Opelousas Indians players
Philadelphia Phillies players
Roswell Sunshiners players
Tyler Trojans players